Sanguinaccio dolce is an Italian pudding made from pig's blood which is made creamy and sweetened with ingredients such as chocolate, milk, pine nuts, raisins and sugar.  In Naples, it is traditionally prepared for Carnevale – the feast day before Lent.  It is also found in other regions of Italy where there are local variations in the degree to which it is served warm and runny for dipping or allowed to set and formed into a pudding or cake. However, public sale of pig blood was banned for health reasons in 1992.

The dessert appears in the TV series Hannibal as a favourite of Hannibal Lecter.

See also

 Biroldo
 Czernina
 List of Italian desserts
 Pig's blood cake
 Pig blood curd
 Blood as food

References

Blood dishes
Chocolate desserts
Italian desserts